The 109th Attack Squadron is an Iraqi Air Force ground-attack squadron. It operates the Sukhoi Su-25 from Al Rasheed Air Base.

Pre-2003 era
No. 109 Squadron was established in 1978. It was equipped with Sukhoi Su-22s, and was based at Wahda AB near Basra. No. 109 Squadron's pilots became the first in Iraq to receive dedicated training for anti-ship attacks.

The squadron participated in the three waves of Iraqi air strikes on Iran on the first day of the Iran-Iraq War. It did not lose any aircraft on that day.

Post-2003 era
On 2 April 2015, the Iraqi Ministry of Defence confirmed that the 109th Attack Squadron had been formed at Rasheed Air Base to operate the Sukhoi Su-25s the country received from Russia and Iran. The first of these aircraft had arrived in Iraq on 28 June 2014.

References

Notes

Bibliography

Further reading
 Iraqi Fighters: 1953-2003: Camouflage and markings by Ahmad Sadik and Tom Cooper, published in 2008 by Harpia Publishing, 

109th Squadron
Military units and formations established in 2015